The 2001 Liga Sudamericana de Básquetbol, or 2001 FIBA South American League, was the sixth edition of the top-tier tournament for basketball teams from South America. The tournament began on 12 February 2001 and finished on 13 April 2001. Argentine team Estudiantes de Olavarría won their first title, defeating Gimnasia y Esgrima de Comodoro Rivadavia in the finals. This tournament saw the only appearance of a team from outside South America, the NBDL Ambassadors from the United States, coached by Nate Archibald. The team played their only home game in the stadium of Unión de Santa Fe in the quarterfinals, where they lost the series 1–2 against Brazilian team Flamengo.

Format
Teams were split into four groups of four teams each, and played each other in a round-robin format. The top two teams from each group advanced to the final stage, a best-of-three direct playoff elimination in the quarterfinals and the semifinals, and a best-of-five elimination series in the Grand Finals, where the champion was decided.

Teams

Group stage

Group A

Group B

Group C

Group D

Final stage

Quarterfinals

Game 1

Game 2

Game 3

Semifinals

Game 1

Game 2

Game 3

Grand Finals

Finals rosters
Estudiantes de Olavarría:
Gustavo Fernández, Daniel Farabello, Byron Wilson, DeWayne McCray, Gabriel Fernández - Victor Baldo, Paolo Quinteros. Coach: Sérgio Hernández 

Gimnasia de Comodoro Rivadavia: Leonardo Diebold, Pablo Moldú, David Scott, Leandro Masieri, Stanley Easterling. Coach: Fernando Duró

Season MVP: Daniel Farabello

References

Liga Sudamericana
2001